was a district located in Hidaka Subprefecture, Hokkaido, Japan.

As of 2004, the district had an estimated population of 4,950 and a density of 14.30 persons per km2. The total area was 346.23 km2.

On March 31, 2006, Mitsuishi District merged with Shizunai District to create the new Hidaka District. Mitsuishi District and Shizunai District were both dissolved with this merger.

Towns and villages
 Mitsuishi

Former districts of Hokkaido